Carlos Casal (born 2 August 1946) is a Uruguayan boxer. He competed in the men's light welterweight event at the 1968 Summer Olympics. At the 1968 Summer Olympics, he lost to Giambattista Capretti of Italy.

References

1946 births
Living people
Uruguayan male boxers
Olympic boxers of Uruguay
Boxers at the 1968 Summer Olympics
Sportspeople from Montevideo
Light-welterweight boxers